Two Cents Worth of Hope is a 1952 film directed by Renato Castellani. It is the third part of Castellani's Young Love trilogy, following Sotto il sole di Roma (1948) and È primavera...(1950).

It shared the Grand Prix prize with Othello at the 1952 Cannes Film Festival.

Plot 
The story concerns the romance between Carmela (Fiore) and Antonio (Musolino). The ardor is one-sided at first, but Carmela is a determined young woman, willing to scale and conquer any obstacle in pursuing her heart's desire. Once he's "hooked", Antonio scurries from job to job to prove his financial viability. Faced with the hostility of their parents, Carmela and Antonio symbolically shed themselves of all responsibilities to others in a climactic act of stark-naked bravado.

Cast
 Maria Fiore - Carmela
 Vincenzo Musolino - Antonio
 Filomena Russo - Antonio's Mother
 Luigi Astarita - Pasquale Artu
 Luigi Barone - The priest
 Carmela Cirillo - Giulia
 Felicità Lettieri - Signora Artu
 Gina Mascetti - Flora Angelini
 Alfonso Del Sorbo - Sacrestano
 Tommaso Balzamo - Luigi Bellomo
 Anna Raiola - Signora Bellomo
 Gioacchino Morrone
 Luigi Cutino
 Pasqualina Izza
 Antonio Balzamo

References

External links 
 
 Cannes profile

1952 films
Italian black-and-white films
1952 romantic comedy films
Films scored by Nino Rota
1950s Italian-language films
Palme d'Or winners
Social realism in film
Films directed by Renato Castellani
Films scored by Alessandro Cicognini
Italian romantic comedy films
1950s Italian films